The following are the list of Boulé conferences which were held by Alpha Kappa Alpha Sorority, Incorporated:

Notes
No Boulé occurred in 1942 due to World War II. The 41st Boulé was the last meeting which was scheduled around the Christmas holiday.  After the 41st Boulé, Boulé meetings were held every two years. The 69th Annual Boule scheduled for July 15–19, 2020 in Philadelphia, PA was canceled due to concerns over COVID 19.

References

See also
Alpha Kappa Alpha

Boulés
Alpha Kappa Alpha